Emanuel United Church of Christ Cemetery is a historic church cemetery associated with the Emanuel United Church of Christ near Thomasville, Davidson County, North Carolina.  It contains approximately 500 gravestones, with the earliest gravestone dated to 1808.  It features a unique collection of folk gravestones by local stonecutters erected in Davidson County in the late-18th and first half of the 19th centuries.

It was listed on the National Register of Historic Places in 1984.

References

Cemeteries on the National Register of Historic Places in North Carolina
Cemeteries in Davidson County, North Carolina
National Register of Historic Places in Davidson County, North Carolina